Bağlıisa is a village in the Karlıova District, Bingöl Province, Turkey. The village is populated by Kurds of the Cibran and Ziktî tribes and had a population of 1,072 in 2021.

The hamlets of Çiçekli, Horhor, Morkoyun and Ulukapı are attached to the village.

References 

Villages in Karlıova District
Kurdish settlements in Bingöl Province